The  was the fourth annual professional wrestling single-elimination tournament promoted by World Wonder Ring Stardom in Tokyo, Japan. The event took place on April 30, 2018.

Storylines
The show featured fourteen Cinderella Tournament  matches and a dark match with scripted storylines, where wrestlers portray villains, heroes, or less distinguishable characters in the scripted events that built tension and culminate in a wrestling match or series of matches. The matches can be won by pinfall, submission or elimination over the top rope. A time-limit draw or a double elimination means a loss for each competitor.

Event
The preshow included a dark match in which Hanan, the High Speed Champion Mary Apache, Nao Yamaguchi, Natsumi and the Future of Stardom Champion Starlight Kid defeated AZM, Leo Onozaki, Natsuko Tora, Ruaka and Shiki Shibusawa as a result of a ten-woman tag team match. The Cinderella tournament had one draw between Io Shirai and Mayu Iwatani who went on a 10-minute time limit draw in the semifinal, feature which handed both Momo Watanabe and Bea Priestley walkover victories straight to the finals. Watanabe succeeded in winning the tournament with her granted wish being a match for the Wonder of Stardom Championship against the then-time champion Io Shirai.

Participants
The tournament was composed by 16 competitors including the champions. It was an event to conclude in a single day.

*Noted underneath were the champions who held their titles at the time of the tournament.

Brackets

Notes

References

External links
Page Stardom World

2018 in professional wrestling
2018 in Tokyo
Women's professional wrestling shows
World Wonder Ring Stardom shows
World Wonder Ring Stardom
Professional wrestling in Tokyo